Big Rob may refer to:

Robert Feggans, bodyguard to the Jonas Brothers, Britney Spears, Demi Lovato, and Fifth Harmony 
Rob Terry (born 1980), Welsh professional wrestler

See also
 Big Bob (disambiguation)